Peter Laufer (13 September 1936 – 4 March 2016) was a German athlete. He competed in the men's pole vault at the 1960 Summer Olympics.

References

1936 births
2016 deaths
Athletes (track and field) at the 1960 Summer Olympics
German male pole vaulters
Olympic athletes of the United Team of Germany
Sportspeople from Wrocław